AMITA Health was an interfaith health system, a joint venture between Alexian Brothers Health System and Presence Health (both part of Ascension) and Adventist Midwest Health (part of AdventHealth). As of 2021, AMITA operated 19 hospitals and hundreds of medical offices, among other facilities. In 2022, the joint venture was broken up.

History 
In February 2015, AMITA Health was created as a joint venture between Alexian Brothers Health System (part of Ascension) and Adventist Midwest Health (part of AdventHealth). In 2018, Ascension acquired Presence Health and merged it into AMITA Health.  Company representatives said the name AMITA was chosen because it had meaning in several languages: in Hebrew, it means honesty and truth; in Hindi, it means spiritual light and boundlessness; and it Italian, it means friendship. In September 2019, several executives left Amita Health, including original CEO Bajkyevr Huff. In December 2019, the company named Keith A. Parrot president and CEO.

On October 21, 2021, AMITA Health announced that the joint venture would be dissolved in the future, with each member hospital remaining in one of those two groups. 
The split became effective April 1, 2022. The Adventist locations rebranded to the AdventHealth name, with Ascension Illinois unifying the former Presence Health and Alexian Brothers facilities under the Ascension name.

Religious heritage 
The founders of the AMITA Health facilities were:
Congregation of Alexian Brothers
Franciscan Sisters of the Sacred Heart
Servants of the Holy Heart of Jesus
Seventh-day Adventist Church Illinois Conference	
Sisters of Mercy of the Americas
Sisters of the Holy Family of Nazareth, Holy Family Province
Sisters of the Resurrection, Immaculate Conception Province

All of the founders and of the acquired medical groups and centers, except for those of the Seventh-day Adventist Church, were affiliated with the Catholic Church.

References

Healthcare in Chicago
Hospital networks in the United States
Healthcare in the United States
Medical and health organizations based in Illinois
AdventHealth
Non-profit organizations based in Illinois
Catholic health care
Christian charities based in the United States
Religious corporations
Catholic charities
Non-profit corporations
Companies based in Chicago
Catholic hospital networks in the United States
Joint ventures